The 2013–14 Big Bash League season or BBL|03 was the third season of the Big Bash League, the premier Twenty20 cricket competition in Australia. The tournament began on 20 December 2013 and ended on 7 February 2014. The format remained the same as the previous season but ran for a time-frame that is two weeks longer. The schedule also overlapped with the 2013–14 Ashes series. It was the first season to be broadcast on free-to-air television on Network Ten.

The tournament was won by Perth Scorchers and the final was hosted at the WACA Ground in Perth, Australia. The Scorchers beat the Hobart Hurricanes in the final by 39 runs. Ben Dunk from the Hurricanes was named the 'Man of the Tournament' while Jonathan Wells from the same team was named the 'Young Gun of the Tournament'.

Points table

Group stage

Fixtures
Times shown are in Australian Western Standard Time (UTC+08:00) for Perth, Australian Central Daylight Time (UTC+10:30) for Adelaide, Australian Eastern Standard Time (UTC+10:00) for Brisbane and Australian Eastern Daylight Time (UTC+11:00) for all other venues.

Knockout phase

Fixtures

Attendance and viewership

Statistics
 Most runs: Ben Dunk
 Most wickets: Cameron Gannon

References

External links
Official fixtures
Tournament site on ESPN Cricinfo

Big Bash League seasons
Big Bash League
Big Bash League